4Q510–511, also given the title Songs of the Sage or Songs of the Maskil (שירי משכיל "instructor"), is a fragmentary Hebrew-language manuscript of a Jewish magical text of incantation and exorcism in the Dead Sea Scrolls, specifically for protection against a list of demons. It is notable for containing the first clear usage of the Hebrew (or Aramaic) term lilith in relation to a supernatural creature. It is comparable to Aramaic incantation 4Q560 and also 11Q11.

Physical state of the scrolls 
There are two versions of Songs of the Sage, traditionally titled Songs of the Sagea (4Q510) and Songs of the Sageb (4Q511).  The text is highly fragmentary, with portions of only eleven out of twenty-one columns extant.  There are seven extant fragments of Songs of the Sagea and 215 of Songs of the Sageb.  There is some disagreement about how these fragments should be ordered.

Date and provenance 
Based on paleographical considerations the scroll is usually dated to the late first century BCE.  Its terminology indicates that it is a sectarian composition.

Cosmology 
The text assumes that the world is populated with evil angels under the dominion of Beliel, a figure (like Satan) of ultimate personified evil.  The Instructor of the community is charged with reciting the words of this liturgy to keep these forces at bay: "And I, the Instructor, proclaim His glorious splendor so as to frighten and to te[riffy] all the spirits of the destroying angels, spirits of the bastards, demons, Lilith, howlers, and [desert dweller...] and those which fall upon men without warning to lead them astray from a spirit of understanding."

Connection to other liturgical texts among the Dead Sea Scrolls 
The text contains several phrases that appear also in other Qumran liturgies, such as Songs of the Sabbath Sacrifice and Berakhot (4Q286 and 4Q287).  Some themes – especially those of the Instructor positioning himself as a lowly and sinful person – appear also in the Thanksgiving Hymns.

References

Dead Sea Scrolls